New Mexico State University Alamogordo (NMSU-A) is a public community college in Alamogordo, New Mexico. It is a branch campus of New Mexico State University at Las Cruces and is accredited by North Central Association of Colleges and Schools.

History 
New Mexico State University Alamogordo was established in 1958 and classes were held at night on the Alamogordo High School campus. The main purpose of the post-secondary educational venture was to serve the military and civilian personnel at Holloman Air Force Base (HAFB), as well as students from the local nonmilitary population. The service area of the school includes HAFB, White Sands Missile Range, the Mescalero Apache Reservation, and approximately twenty villages and towns.

Curriculum 
The community college offers certificate and associate degrees. The college has a transfer articulation agreement with New Mexico State University in Las Cruces for NMSU-A students who plan to pursue bachelor's degrees.

Notable alumni 

 Rachel A. Black, member of the New Mexico House of Representatives

Gallery

References

External links

Official website

New Mexico State University
Community colleges in New Mexico
Alamogordo, New Mexico